The Rarely Herd are an American bluegrass band from Athens County, Ohio, founded in 1989, playing progressive and traditional bluegrass as well as their own unique compositions and adaptations from other genres.

History
The Rarely Herd toured extensively on the festival circuit, where audiences enjoyed their close vocal harmonies and high energy performances. In 1997 they performed in Scarborough, Ontario, Canada as part of the Bluegrass Sundays Concert Series organized by the Northern Bluegrass Committee.  In 1997 they were headliners at the Central Canadian Bluegrass Awards festival in Huntsville, Ontario.

In 1992 the Rarely Herd showcased at the International Bluegrass Music Awards.  That year their first album, "Midnight Loneliness" was issued by Pinecastle, followed by "Heartbreak City" in 1994. "What About Him", released in 1996, earned then a Dove Award nomination. "Coming of Age" was released in 1998, "Part of Growing Up" was released in 2000, both produced by Ronnie Reno. Three more CD's, "Return Journey" in 2004, "Round-up, Vol One" in 2007, and "Fields of the Harvest" in 2007, were released on their own label.

Members

Current
Jim Stack-Guitar/Vovals
Jeff Weaver-Bass/Vocals
Calvin Leport-Banjo
Dan Brooks-Dobro
Alan Stack-Fiddle/Mandolin/Vocals

Former
Jeff Hardin
Ned Luberecki
Shayne Bartley
Chris Stockwell
Todd Sams
Brandon Shuping

Discography

Main albums
1992 - Midnight Loneliness
1994 - Heartbreak City
1995 - Pure Homemade Love
1997 - What About Him
1998 - Coming of Age
2000 - Part of Growing Up
2004 - Return Journey
2007 - Fields of the Harvest

Compilations
2007 - Roundup, Vol. 1

Videos
1997 - The Rarely Herd: Live from Kissimmee

Singles
1993 - The Fish Song, Living in a Mobile Home

See also
The Seldom Scene
Blue Highway
IIIrd Tyme Out

References

External links
Official website
Official MySpace page
[ The Rarely Herd] at Allmusic
CMT Biography
Yahoo! Music Biography

Musical groups established in 1989
People from Athens, Ohio
People from Athens County, Ohio
Musical groups from Ohio
American bluegrass music groups
American country music groups
American country rock groups
American gospel musical groups
American southern rock musical groups
Musical groups from Appalachia
Country musicians from Ohio
Jam bands